Ernie Hudson is a Canadian politician, who was elected to the Legislative Assembly of Prince Edward Island in the 2019 Prince Edward Island general election. He represents the district of Alberton-Bloomfield as a member of the Progressive Conservative Party of Prince Edward Island.

On May 9, 2019, Hudson was appointed to the Executive Council of Prince Edward Island as Minister of Social Development and Housing.

References 

Living people
Progressive Conservative Party of Prince Edward Island MLAs
Members of the Executive Council of Prince Edward Island
People from Prince County, Prince Edward Island
21st-century Canadian politicians
Year of birth missing (living people)